St Peter and St Paul is the Church of England parish church of Checkendon, a village in Oxfordshire, England. Its parish is part of the Deanery of Henley in the Diocese of Oxford. Its earliest parts are 12th-century and it is a Grade I listed building.

The church is a Norman building. All but one of the windows were replaced later in the Middle Ages with Decorated Gothic and Perpendicular Gothic ones, and the Perpendicular Gothic west tower is also a later addition.

The church is served by Langtree Team Ministry, which is also responsible for St Mary’s Church in Ipsden, St Mary’s Church in North Stoke,  St John the Evangelist Church in Stoke Row, St John the Baptist in Whitchurch Hill, St Mary’s Church in Whitchurch-on-Thames, and St Leonard’s Church in Woodcote.

References

Sources

External links
Langtree Team Ministry

Church of England church buildings in Oxfordshire
Grade I listed buildings in Oxford
Grade I listed churches in Oxfordshire